Raymond Ellis "Red" McKee (July 20, 1890 – August 5, 1972) was an American baseball catcher.  He played professional baseball for 19 years from 1910 to 1928, including four seasons in Major League Baseball with the Detroit Tigers from 1913 to 1916.  He appeared in 189 major league games and compiled a .254 batting average.

Early years
McKee was born in Shawnee, Perry County, Ohio, in 1890.

Professional baseball
McKee was drafted by the New York Highlanders from Indianapolis of the American Association.  Two days later, the Highlanders traded McKee to the Tigers for Claud Derrick.  From 1913 to 1916, McKee played in 189 games for the Detroit Tigers, 150 as a catcher and the rest as a pinch hitter.  He had a career batting average of .254 and an on-base percentage of .339.  In 1913, McKee had 237 putouts, 84 assists, and 5 double plays in only 62 games as a catcher.  

He also played 19 seasons in the minor leagues, including stints with the Indianapolis Indians (1910-1912), Springfield Reapers (1911-1912), San Francisco Seals (1917-1919), Saginaw Aces (1920-1921), San Antonio Bears (1922), Syracuse Stars (1923-1925), Baltimore Orioles (1925-1926), and Memphis Chickasaws (1927-1928). He also managed the Saginaw Aces of the Michigan-Ontario League in 1920 and 1921.

Later years
McKee died in Saginaw, Michigan at age 82.

References

1890 births
1972 deaths
Detroit Tigers players
Major League Baseball catchers
Baseball players from Ohio
People from Shawnee, Perry County, Ohio
Minor league baseball managers
Indianapolis Indians players
Springfield Reapers players
Toronto Maple Leafs (International League) players
San Francisco Seals (baseball) players
Saginaw Aces players
San Antonio Bears players
Syracuse Stars (minor league baseball) players
London Tecumsehs (baseball) players
Grand Rapids Homoners players
Baltimore Orioles (IL) players
Memphis Chickasaws players